Yoo Jung-ju (born 13 December 1975) is a South Korean animator currently serving as a Democratic member of National Assembly.

Yoo runs the animator company Gotagi and previously led the Korea Animation Industry Association. In the 2020 general election, she was recruited by Platform Party as part of its efforts to prioritise representatives of the civil societies and industries for its proportional representation list. She was placed as the number 10 on the list and her nomination was welcomed by animation industry trade unions.

She was also the member of Presidential Council on Intellectual Property chaired by then Prime Minister Lee Nak-yeon.

Yoo is a daughter of Yoo Sung-woong who produced popular animation films in 1980s

Yoo holds two degrees in film studies - a bachelor from Sangmyung University and a master's from Dongguk University. She also completed a doctorate programme at Dongguk University.

Electoral history

References 

Living people
1975 births
Sangmyung University alumni
Dongguk University alumni
Members of the National Assembly (South Korea)
South Korean animators
South Korean women animators
Minjoo Party of Korea politicians
Female members of the National Assembly (South Korea)